Milos Reindl (Czech name: Miloš Reindl) was a Czech-Canadian artist and graphic designer, who is best known for his large-scale paintings and film posters. Trained in the ateliers of Emil Filla and Antonín Kýbal, Reindl left Czechoslovakia in 1968 and emigrated to Canada as a political refugee.

Following in the tradition of Czech Cubism, Reindl’s style was greatly influenced by European modern art, in particular Pablo Picasso, Henri Matisse, Marc Chagall and Jean Dubuffet.

Early life 

Born in Czechoslovakia in 1923, Reindl studied at the Academy of Arts, Architecture and Design in Prague, under the tutelage of the avant-garde artist Emil Filla and the textile artist Antonín Kýbal. Reindl graduated in 1951 and married Helena Pokorna, a fellow art student and niece of the sculptor Karel Pokorný, in that same year.

Early work 

In 1957, Reindl began working for a Prague advertising studio as a graphic artist, specializing in film posters.  At that time, the cost of importing international film posters to Czechoslovakia was prohibitively expensive, and local artists like Reindl were employed to create their own interpretations, often without seeing the films. During the late 50s and early 60s, Reindl created dozens of posters for films such as 12 Angry Men (1957 film), Murder, She Said and Admiral Ushakov (film).

Emigration to Canada 

Following the Soviet invasion of Czechoslovakia in 1968, Reindl emigrated to Montreal, Canada as a political refugee. In the early 1970s he began a career as an art professor, teaching for nearly thirty years at Laval University. During his years as a teacher, Reindl continued to paint, creating hundreds of oil paintings, gouaches, and drawings over the course of his career, however his work was only shared with only a few close friends until after his death in 2002.

Artistic Style 

Emil Filla’s influence on Reindl’s work can be seen in his flattened perspective and bold use of color, typical hallmarks of Czech Cubism. Reindl’s work stands out for the bold lines of his drawings and the almost Baroque compositions, which are filled with apparently random details.

Exhibitions 

 2002: "Milos Reindl: une célébration de vie," Université de Montréal, Montreal, Canada
 2003: Milos Reindl Retrospective, Saint Bruno, Canada 
 2004: Milos Reindl Retrospective, Prague Castle, Czech Republic
 2016: "Do Not Pass By," Prague, Czech Republic, Film Posters
 2016: "Do Not Pass By," Montreal, Canada, Film Posters

External links 

 Palbric Art Foundation - Milos Reindl
 Palais Art Hotel Prague - Milos Reindl Collection

References 

Czech artists
Czech graphic designers
Applicants for refugee status in Canada
Czech refugees
1923 births
2002 deaths
Artists from Montreal
Czechoslovak emigrants to Canada
Academy of Arts, Architecture and Design in Prague alumni